WEID-LD, virtual channel 18 (UHF digital channel 16), is a low-powered Daystar owned-and-operated television station licensed to South Bend, Indiana, United States. The station is owned by Word of God Fellowship.

History
Originally licensed to Elkhart, on March 16, 2006, the station was granted a construction permit to begin converting operations to digital television.

TBN took W18CF silent on March 8, 2010, citing declining support, which has been attributed to the digital transition.  Eleven days later, on March 19, a deal was reached to sell W18CF to Word of God Fellowship, owner of the Daystar Television Network.

On October 13, 2010, the station changed its calls to WEID-LP. On November 8, it filed a displacement application to operate a digital signal on channel 16 (formerly occupied by the analog signal of WNDU-TV). The application was granted a construction permit on January 25, 2011. The digital signal was licensed to South Bend on December 1, 2014. The station changed its call sign to WEID-LD on November 9, 2015.

Digital television

Digital channel

References

External links

EID-LD
Daystar (TV network) affiliates
Television channels and stations established in 1989
Low-power television stations in the United States
1989 establishments in Indiana